Ramkishan Adig (born 7 August 1967) is an Indian artist and a practitioner of The Social-Realism style in painting. Born of a small village in Rajasthan (India), he studied art at Rajasthan school of Art, Jaipur. He joined the Progressive Writers Association and Peoples' Theater Association as an executive. He has participated many national and international level exhibitions, and his work is centered on themes based in Rajasthani culture. He is currently a Art faculty for Navodaya Vidyalaya Samiti

Toom10
Toom10 was founded by Ramkishan Adig in 1990. It produces art exhibitions, solo shows, and art workshops.

Education and Work

Education 
B.F.A.
PGDJ

Participation 
National Art Exhibition, LKA, New Delhi
AIFACS, New Delhi
SCZCC, Nagpur
Toom10 Group Exhibitions
Sahmat, Group Exhibition
Varnika, Roopam etc. Group Exhibition by Rajasthan School of Art Alumni and many other group exhibition

Camps 
Kalawritt Sculptors Camp 1990, 1992 & 2008
Painters workshop by Jawahar Kala Kendra Jaipur 2009

Solo Show 
Mohta Institute of Folklore Research, Sadulpur 1990
Maharani Sudarshana Art Gallery, Bikaner 1999
‘Around The Sun’ Jawahar Kala Kendra, Jaipur 2007
Many Poster Exhibitions with PWA and IPTA 1990 to 2006
‘Mohatarma’ Jawahar Kala Kendra, Jaipur 2009
Soochna Kendra Churu 2010

Others 

Lalit Kala Akademy Research Grant 1994
RLKA Scholarship 1990 to 1992
Published many articles on art and education in magazines
Thousands of illustrations published in books, papers and magazines
Secretary, Rajasthan School of Art Alumni
Works in Collections India and Abroad
Executive member of Progressive Writer's Association Rajasthan and Indian People's Theatre association Rajasthan
Executive Toom10
2010 Chief Designer, PustakParwa by Rajasthan Hindi GranthAkademi

Awards

Asia-pacific Cultural Centre For UNESCO, Japan, 1996
Rajasthan Lalit Kala Akademy Student Award, 1992
Rajasthan School of Art Annual Awards 1991, 1992
Rajasthan School of Art Best Student Award 1992
‘Guru Shreshtha’ 2002 and ‘Guru Param’ 2003 Awards By NVS, Delhi

References 

 http://toom10.blogspot.com/
 http://chitrasutra.blogspot.com/
 http://rajasthanikavita.blogspot.com/2010/11/blog-post_7547.html
 http://churustars.blogspot.com/2010/04/blog-post.html
 https://web.archive.org/web/20120326202950/http://www.dailynewsnetwork.in/news/21022011/metro-mix/29229.html
 http://dularam.blogspot.com/2010/03/blog-post_10.html

External links 
 http://toom10.blogspot.com/
 http://chitrasutra.blogspot.com/
 http://www.tribuneindia.com/2009/20090803/bathinda.htm
 http://bhatnersaraswati.com/?page_id=689

20th-century Indian painters
Painters from Rajasthan
1967 births
Living people
People from Churu district